The Bernhard Museum Complex is a history museum located in Auburn, California, United States. It consists of one of the oldest buildings in Placer County, Traveler's Rest, which was built in 1851 as a hotel.

History

The complex includes the historic building, Traveler's Rest, which was built in 1851. The hotel was popular with miners and those traveling along Auburn Folsom Road. In 1858 it became a home. In 1868 it was bought by German immigrant Benjamin Bernhard, who moved to America in 1846. The property became a winery in 1874, with the addition of a winery building and an additional building for processing in 1881.

Museum
Today, the museum features the restored winery and processing building, and the home which is decorated in the Victorian period style. Costumed interpreters give tours of the site. There is also a carriage barn which was built by the Native Sons of the Golden West. It houses a collection of wagons, including a buggy and a mud wagon. In 2007, the Placer County Museums Living History Program built a summer kitchen.

Collection

The museum includes objects from everyday Victorian life, wagons, and objects related to the 19th century winemaking.

References

External links
Official website

Museums in Placer County, California
Historic house museums in California
Auburn, California
Museums established in 1851
1851 establishments in California